Monte Mário is a settlement in Caué District on São Tomé Island in São Tomé and Príncipe. Its population is 200 (2012 census). The locality lies 5 km northeast of Porto Alegre.

Population history

References

Populated places in Caué District
Populated coastal places in São Tomé and Príncipe